Bleta Rexha (born August 30, 1989), known professionally as Bebe Rexha, is an American singer and songwriter. After signing with Warner Records in 2013, Rexha received songwriting credits on Eminem's single "The Monster" (which later received the Grammy Award for Best Rap/Sung Performance) and has also contributed songwriting to songs recorded by Shinee, Selena Gomez, and Nick Jonas. Rexha released her debut extended play in 2015, I Don't Wanna Grow Up, which saw the moderate commercial success of the singles "I Can't Stop Drinking About You" and "I'm Gonna Show You Crazy".

Rexha released two additional extended plays in 2017, All Your Fault: Pt. 1 and All Your Fault: Pt. 2, which again saw the moderate success of the singles "I Got You" and "The Way I Are (Dance with Somebody)". Rexha has also seen success with several collaborations including "Hey Mama" with David Guetta, Nicki Minaj and Afrojack, "Me, Myself & I" with G-Eazy, "In the Name of Love" with Martin Garrix, and "Meant to Be" featuring Florida Georgia Line, the latter of which had large success as a country crossover single, peaking at number two on the Billboard Hot 100 chart in the United States. Rexha's debut studio album, Expectations (2018), reached number 13 on the Billboard 200 chart in the United States and saw the success of its lead single, "I'm a Mess", and brought Rexha two nominations for Best New Artist and Best Country Duo/Group Performance at the 61st Grammy Awards.<ref
name="itunes expectations"></ref> Rexha released her second studio album, Better Mistakes, in 2021.

Early life 

Bebe Rexha was born as Bleta Rexha on August 30, 1989, in Brooklyn, New York City into an ethnic Albanian family from North Macedonia. Her father, Flamur Rexha, was born in Debar, North Macedonia, when it was part of Yugoslavia and emigrated to the U.S. at the age of 21. Her mother, Bukurije Rexha, was born in the United States to an Albanian family with roots in Gostivar, North Macedonia. In the Albanian language,  means "bee"; and she explained "My parents are Albanian, and people started calling me 'Bebe' for short." She and her family moved to nearby Staten Island when she was six. Rexha has a brother named Florent.

Rexha played trumpet and taught herself to play guitar and piano. Rexha attended Tottenville High School on Staten Island, where she took part in a variety of musicals. She also joined the choir, while still in high school. After joining the choir, she discovered that her voice was a coloratura soprano. Rexha lists Coldplay, the Cranberries, Lauryn Hill, Alanis Morissette, and Kanye West as musical influences.

As a teenager, Rexha submitted a song to be performed at the National Academy of Recording Arts & Sciences' annual "Grammy Day" event. Rexha earned the "Best Teen Songwriter" award, beating around 700 other entrants. As a result, she signed a contract with talent scout Samantha Cox, who encouraged Rexha to enroll in songwriting classes in Manhattan.

Career

2011–2012: Career beginnings with Black Cards 

In 2010, Rexha met Fall Out Boy's bassist Pete Wentz and began working with him at a recording studio in New York City. She became a member and a lead vocalist of Wentz's new experimental project called Black Cards. The band played a variety of live shows and released several singles and remixes. However, in January 2012, Wentz announced that Rexha had left the band to pursue other endeavors. Bebe Rexha was awarded the Abe Olman Scholarship for her contributions as a songwriter later that year.

2013–2016: Solo debut, I Don't Wanna Grow Up and collaborations
In 2013, Rexha signed with Warner Bros. Records as a solo artist. Rexha had begun writing several songs, including Selena Gomez's "Like a Champion" and Nikki Williams's "Glowing". Her most prominent songwriting effort of 2013 was Eminem's and Rihanna's "The Monster", which was released as the fourth single from Eminem's album The Marshall Mathers LP 2. The song went on to top the charts for the US Billboard Hot 100 and the US Hot R&B/Hip-Hop Songs and won a Grammy Award for Best Rap/Sung Performance at the 57th Annual Grammy Awards ceremony. That same year, Rexha also wrote and was featured on Cash Cash's single "Take Me Home", which peaked within the top ten of the charts in Australia and the United Kingdom.

On March 21, 2014, Rexha released her debut single, "I Can't Stop Drinking About You". The song peaked at number 22 on the US Top Heatseekers chart. The music video was released on August 12, 2014. The video was inspired by imagery from films such as Girl, Interrupted and Melancholia. In November 2014, Rexha was featured on rapper Pitbull's song "This Is Not a Drill". and in September 2014, she was picked as Elvis Duran's Artist of the Month and was featured on NBC's Today show hosted by Kathie Lee Gifford and Hoda Kotb, where she performed live her single "I Can't Stop Drinking About You".

In December 2014, Rexha released two more singles, "I'm Gonna Show You Crazy" and "Gone". On May 12, 2015, she released her debut EP, I Don't Wanna Grow Up, through Warner Bros. Records. She also co-wrote and was featured on David Guetta's single "Hey Mama", alongside Nicki Minaj and Afrojack. The song peaked at number eight on the Billboard Hot 100 and received 1.1 million downloads . The song did not originally credit Rexha, despite the fact that she sings the chorus and is featured on background vocals. Eventually, in June 2015, she was given a credit for her work.

In January 2015, Rexha co-wrote and was featured on G-Eazy's "Me, Myself & I". The song peaked at number seven on the Billboard Hot 100 and at number one on the US Pop Songs chart. The song was originally titled "I Don't Need Anything" and was intended as a song for Rexha herself. Instead, she brought the song idea to G-Eazy and was featured during the chorus.

Rexha met Nicki Minaj's manager, Gee Roberson, and asked if Minaj would contribute to a new song. In March 2016, Rexha released her single, called "No Broken Hearts" featuring Nicki Minaj. In April 2016, the music video was released, directed by Dave Meyer. The video has accumulated over 300 million views on YouTube.

On July 29, 2016, Rexha and Dutch DJ and record producer Martin Garrix released their single, "In the Name of Love". It peaked at number 24 on the US Billboard Hot 100, at number four on US Hot Dance/Electronic Songs chart and entered the top 10 in several countries, including the United Kingdom, Canada, Australia, Italy, and New Zealand. The music video was released on August 23, 2016, on Martin Garrix's YouTube channel.

2016–2017: All Your Fault series 

On October 28, 2016, Rexha released "I Got You". That song along with "No Broken Hearts" were originally intended for the All Your Fault album. I Got You peaked at number 43 on the US Billboard Hot 100 and at number 17 on the US Pop Songs chart. The music video was released on January 6, 2017, and reached over 50 million views in four weeks, and has accumulated over 365 million views on YouTube. Direction changed from a full studio album to a multi EP project and "No Broken Hearts" was scrapped, making "I Got You" the first and only single from All Your Fault: Pt. 1, released on February 17, 2017. The EP peaked at number 51 on the Billboard 200. In March 2017 in Dallas, Rexha began her first solo headlining tour, promoting the EP across North America and Europe, named the All Your Fault Tour, with a total of 29 dates.

On November 6, 2016, Rexha hosted the 2016 MTV Europe Music Awards, at Rotterdam, Netherlands and performed multiple songs throughout the night, such as her single, "I Got You".

In May 2017, Bebe Rexha: The Ride, a documentary which explores the moments which changed Rexha's life and journey to stardom, aired on MTV.

On July 21, 2017, One Direction member Louis Tomlinson released the single "Back to You", with Rexha and Digital Farm Animals as featured artists. The song peaked at number 40 on the Billboard Hot 100.

"The Way I Are (Dance with Somebody)" featuring Lil Wayne was released as the first single from All Your Fault: Pt. 2 on May 19, 2017. On June 12, Rexha performed the song at the Ubisoft E3 press conference, before announcing Just Dance 2018, on which the song appears. The second EP as part of the project was released on August 11, 2017. In support of the EP and American singer and songwriter Marc E. Bassy's debut album, Rexha planned to go on a co-headlining tour across the United States: the Bebe & Bassy Tour, in October 2017. The tour was short-lived due to an infection putting Rexha on strict vocal rest, with Marc E. Bassy eventually going on a solo US tour in March 2018.

On October 24, 2017, "Meant to Be" with Florida Georgia Line was released as the second single from All Your Fault: Pt. 2, with the music video premiering a day earlier.

2017–2019: Expectations

In September 2017, Rexha began teasing new songs for a third installment in the All Your Fault series, with her manager going on record about its release. However, it appeared plans had changed, as Bebe revealed through a tweet in November 2017 that her next project would be called Expectations. Rexha revealed the cover art for this debut studio album on April 8, 2018, and the album was released on June 22, 2018. Previous singles from All Your Fault, "I Got You" and "Meant to Be" appear on Expectations as well.

On April 13, 2018, "Ferrari" and "2 Souls on Fire", the latter of which features Quavo of Migos, were released as promotional singles along with the pre-order. On June 15, 2018, "I'm a Mess" was released as the first single from the album. On November 20, 2018, "Say My Name" was released which featured David Guetta and J Balvin. In December 2018, Rexha was nominated for Best New Artist at the 61st Annual Grammy Awards.

On February 15, 2019, Rexha released her single "Last Hurrah". Later that month, it was announced that she would serve as the fifth coach for The Voices Comeback Stage for season 16. Rexha tweeted in April 2019 that she has twelve songs ready for her second studio album, and that her new music is inspired by Britney Spears. On May 1, 2019, it was announced that Rexha will be one of the opening acts of the Jonas Brothers' Happiness Begins Tour. On May 31, Rexha and the Chainsmokers released "Call You Mine". The song is the Chainsmokers' third project using Rexha's voice, following their remixes of "Take Me Home" by production trio Cash Cash, and her debut solo single, "I Can't Stop Drinking About You".

2019–2023: Better Mistakes

Rexha gave further information on her second studio album in June 2019, confirming to Bang Showbiz, "I am heading off to the studio now and I am just creating, creating and creating." She further revealed a feminist theme to the new music, stating that "everything I have been writing now is very empowering and in-your-face and I am really excited about it." In July 2019, Rexha tweeted that she had a song called "Mama"; it was later registered with the music recognition app Shazam.

In January 2020, Rexha confirmed in an interview with Ryan Seacrest on the red carpet of the 62nd Annual Grammy Awards that the album is inspired by her mental health journey, and that she "[has] a tracklisting and it's really exciting. I'm about to pick my next single... either a slower one or an up-tempo one." On October 9, 2020, she released "Baby, I'm Jealous" featuring Doja Cat. Rexha confirmed in an interview in October 2020 that the album would be a visual album.

On March 5, 2021, Rexha released her new single "Sacrifice", with the music video premiering later that day. In March 2021, Rexha released an accessory line with Puma titled "Bebe X Puma", which is exclusively in European Deichmann stores. On April 14, 2021, Rexha announced that her second album Better Mistakes was scheduled for release on May 7, 2021. On April 16, 2021, the third single off the album, "Sabotage" was released.

On April 30, Rexha released the fourth single, "Die for a Man", featuring Lil Uzi Vert from her upcoming album. On May 7, Rexha released her second studio album Better Mistakes, along with a music video for "Break My Heart Myself". The album debuted at #140 on the US Billboard 200.

On October 25, 2021, Rexha announced she would feature on "Family" by David Guetta featuring Ty Dolla Sign and A Boogie wit da Hoodie. On November 19, Masked Wolf released a remix of "Sabotage" titled, "It's You, Not Me". In August 2022, a remix of Eiffel 65's song "Blue (Da Ba Dee)", titled "I'm Good (Blue)", by David Guetta with vocals from Rexha was released after it went viral on TikTok. In January 2023, she started teasing a song titled "Stars" on TikTok, a collaboration with Australian dance music trio Pnau and Puerto Rican singer Ozuna.

2023: Upcoming third studio album 
Studio On February 17, 2023, Rexha released the music video for "Heart Wants What It Wants", as the lead single from her upcoming third music album, expected to release sometime in 2023. The album is said to be inspired by the '70s retro style.

Artistry 
Rexha is known for a variety of genres, primarily pop. Her first song credit was a K-pop song for Shinee, the title song from the album Lucifer, and since then she has released music in the hip hop, alternative rock, R&B, country, rock, dance and electronic music genres.

She was mainly influenced by Lauryn Hill. She was also influenced by other artists such as Bob Marley, Madonna, Christina Aguilera, Blondie, Pink, Alanis Morissette, Avril Lavigne, Coldplay, Johnny Cash, Dolly Parton, The Chicks, Shania Twain, Taylor Swift, and Carrie Underwood.

Personal life 
Rexha is a vocal supporter of the LGBTQ+ community, and has described her own sexuality as "fluid". In 2019, Rexha revealed that she has bipolar disorder.

Discography 

 Expectations (2018)
 Better Mistakes (2021)
 Bebe (2023)

Filmography

Film

Television

Tours 
Headlining
 All Your Fault Tour (2017)

Co-headlining
 Warped Tour (2015)
 Bebe & Bassy Tour (2017)

Opening act
 Nick Jonas – Nick Jonas: Live in Concert (2015)
 Ellie Goulding – Delirium World Tour (2016)
 Bruno Mars – 24K Magic World Tour (2018)
 Katy Perry – Witness: The Tour (2018)
 Jonas Brothers – Happiness Begins Tour (2019)

See also 
List of Albanian Americans
List of people with bipolar disorder

References

External links 

1989 births
 
Living people
American people of Albanian descent
American people of Macedonian descent
Musicians from Brooklyn
Singers from New York City
Songwriters from New York (state)
Warner Records artists
American women country singers
American alternative rock musicians
American hip hop singers
American women hip hop musicians
American women hip hop singers
American women pop singers
American women rock singers
American electronic musicians
Electronic dance music musicians
21st-century American singers
21st-century American women singers
21st-century Albanian singers
American sopranos
People with bipolar disorder
American LGBT songwriters
LGBT women
American LGBT singers
Albanians in North Macedonia
Black Cards members
Sexually fluid women